The 2018 Austin Elite season was the inaugural season in the clubs history since their entry to the Major League Rugby in 2017. Alain Hyardet was the first coach of the club. Andrew Suniula was the club's first ever captain.

The Elite played their home matchups at Round Rock Multipurpose Complex in Round Rock, Texas.

Schedule

Exhibition

Regular season

Standings

References

Austin Gilgronis seasons
2018 in sports in Texas